Paropsiopsis is a genus of flowering plants belonging to the family Passifloraceae.

Its native range is Africa.

Known species
As accepted by Kew:
 Paropsiopsis atrichogyna J.M.de Vos & Breteler 
 Paropsiopsis decandra (Baill.) Sleumer

References

Passifloraceae
Malpighiales genera